Kuheh-ye Do (also Romanized as Kūheh-ye Do) is a village in Jahad Rural District, Hamidiyeh District, Ahvaz County, Khuzestan Province, Iran. At the 2006 census, its population was 46, in 8 families.

References 

Populated places in Ahvaz County